Minari may refer to:

 Korean name for Oenanthe javanica, commonly known as "Java waterdropwort"
 Minari (film), an 2020 American film that follows a South Korean immigrant family in rural 1980s United States
 Minari Engineering, defunct British car manufacturer
 Izumo-Minari Station, train station in Okuizumo, Nita District, Shimane Prefecture, Japan
 Quartiere Minari, subdivision (frazioni) of the comune of Torrile, Italy
 Minari Endoh, author of the Japanese manga series Dazzle
 Elisa Minari, Italian bassist of the band Nomadi
 Ōtabe no Minari, Japanese poet during the Nara period who is featured in the Man'yōshū